Rodarius Marcell Green (born August 27, 1999), known professionally as Rod Wave, is an American rapper and singer. He is known for his strong voice and incorporation of hip hop and R&B, and has been recognized as a trailblazer of soul-trap.

Wave rose to fame with the 2019 single "Heart on Ice", which went viral on YouTube and TikTok and peaked at number 25 on the Billboard Hot 100. Wave's debut album, Ghetto Gospel (2019), peaked at number 10 on the US Billboard 200. His second album, Pray 4 Love (2020), peaked at number 2 on the Billboard 200, and included the song "Rags2Riches", which peaked at number 12 on the Hot 100. His third album, SoulFly (2021), debuted at number 1 on the Billboard 200 (marking his first chart-topping album).

Career 
Wave's career began in 2016, with the release of his mixtape Hunger Games Vol.1. He released several mixtapes independently prior to signing with Alamo Records. On June 14, 2019, he released his mixtape PTSD, which included the song "Heart on Ice". The song went viral on YouTube and TikTok, peaking at number 25 on the Billboard Hot 100. Wave's debut album, Ghetto Gospel, was released on November 1, 2019. It peaked at number 10 on the US Billboard 200.

Rod Wave's second album, Pray 4 Love, was released on April 3, 2020. It debuted at number 2 on the Billboard 200, with a deluxe edition following on August 7. Several songs from the album charted on the Billboard Hot 100, including "s" (featuring ATR Son Son), which peaked at number 12 on the Hot 100 and became his highest-charting song. On August 11, 2020, Wave was included on XXLs 2020 Freshman Class. In July 2020, Wave revealed during an interview that he was working on his third album, which was originally scheduled for August 27, 2020. He revealed the track list for his album SoulFly on March 6, 2021. The album also includes songs "Street Runner" and "Tombstone", his highest-charting song which peaked at number 11 on the Hot 100. In late 2021, Wave's release of the song "Nirvana" generated some controversy because many regarded the song as a suicide letter, which Wave strongly denied.

In January 2022, Wave released the single "Cold December". On May 1, 2022, he released a freestyle of Future's "Wait for U", in which he revealed his next album would be titled Beautiful Mind, while also announcing that he had turned the album in on April 25, 2022. The album was released on August 12, 2022.

Artistry
Wave has been recognized for his "candor and shrewd ability to tug at listeners' heartstrings". ABC News Radio's Rachel George noted that "music is a direct expression of Wave's life, which is why he's cautious yet open to working with other artists who share his passion".

Wave grew up listening to E-40, who was featured in his song "Calabasas", Chingy, Boosie Badazz, Chief Keef, Kanye West, and Kevin Gates, who would later be featured in his song "Cuban Links".

Discography 

 Ghetto Gospel (2019)
 Pray 4 Love (2020)
 SoulFly (2021)
 Beautiful Mind (2022)

Awards and nominations

References 

Living people
21st-century African-American male singers
African-American male rappers
African-American male singers
American contemporary R&B singers
Interscope Records artists
Musicians from St. Petersburg, Florida
Rappers from Florida
Singer-songwriters from Florida
1998 births